Stig Björkman (born 2 October 1938) is a Swedish writer and film critic. He has also directed fifteen films since 1964. His 1972 film Georgia, Georgia was entered into the 23rd Berlin International Film Festival. His 1975 film The White Wall was entered into the 9th Moscow International Film Festival. His 2015 documentary Ingrid Bergman: In Her Own Words was screened in the Cannes Classics section at the 2015 Cannes Film Festival.

Selected bibliography
 Bergman on Bergman: Interviews with Ingmar Bergman (1970), 
 
 Trier on von Trier (1999); Faber & Faber, 2003, 
 Fucking film: den nya svenska filmen (2002)
 Joyce Carol Oates: Samtal med Stig Björkman (2003)

Selected filmography
 Georgia, Georgia (1972)
 The White Wall (1975)
 Ingrid Bergman: In Her Own Words (2015)

References

External links

1938 births
Living people
Swedish male writers
Swedish film directors